Jaime Álvarez may refer to:

Jaime Álvarez Cisneros (born 1974), Mexican politician
Jaime Álvarez Díaz (born 1986), Spanish football manager and former player
Jaime Álvarez Mendoza (born 1948), known as Jaque Mate, Mexican wrestler